The Arkansas Headwaters Recreation Area (AHRA) is one of the United States' most popular locations for whitewater rafting and kayaking on the Arkansas River. There is a total of 150 miles of water that extends from Leadville, Colorado to Pueblo, Colorado and contains many different classes of rapids ranging from Class II-V rapids. Activities within the area include Bicycle Trails, Fishing Guide Service, Hiking/Nature Trails, Horseback Riding Trails, National Forest, Nature Experience, Nature Preserve, Nature Tours, River Raft Trips, Scenic Highway/Byway, Ski/Snowboard Area, State Park, Water Park, Water Recreation.

References

Protected areas of Chaffee County, Colorado
Protected areas of Fremont County, Colorado
Protected areas of Lake County, Colorado
Protected areas of Colorado
Protected areas of Pueblo County, Colorado
Protected areas established in 1998
Bureau of Land Management areas in Colorado
State parks of Colorado
1998 establishments in Colorado